The Kamchatka Volcanic Eruption Response Team (KVERT) is a Russian national institution dedicated to provide information of any volcanic activity taking place on the Kamchatka Peninsula and the Kuril Islands of Russia that could become a threat to local communities and aviation. It was established in 1993 by the Far Eastern Branch of the Russian Academy of Sciences, Institute of Volcanic Geology and Seismology (IVS FEB RAS) under cooperation with the Kamchatkan Branch of Geophysical Survey (KBGS RAS). The Alaska Volcano Observatory (AVO), United States Geological Survey (USGS) and its affiliates also provide joint efforts to the program. The KVERT website, posted in both Russian and English, allows users to view information on volcanoes in the region and monitor reports of active volcanoes. A section also provides webcameras at select locations that update regularly. Currently, around 66 active volcanoes (31 on the Kamchatka Peninsula and 35 in the Kuril Islands) are routinely monitored. The majority of the volcanoes on the Kuril Islands are monitored by the Sakhalin Volcanic Eruption Response Team (SVERT), which is located in Yuzhno-Sakhalinsk, but all reports of volcanic activity in the island chain are posted in joint effort on the KVERT website.

The offices for KVERT are located at the Institute of Volcanic Geology and Seismology in Petropavlovsk-Kamchatsky on the Kamchatka Peninsula.

Monitored volcanoes
The following list shows volcanoes currently monitored by KVERT or SVERT. Many rely on the use activity detection instruments or satellite and local observations. While the majority of these volcanoes are in remote locations and would only pose a threat to aviation, there are a few in some areas that could have an impact on populated communities. Monitored volcanoes are not limited to the ones currently listed, and more may be added in the future if necessary.

Kamchatka Peninsula

 Akademia Nauk in the central region
 Avachinsky in the central region
 Bezymianny in the northern region
 Diky Greben in the southern region
 Gamchen in the central region
 Gorely in the southern region
 Ichinsky in the northern region
 Ilyinsky in the southern region
 Kambalny in the southern region
 Karymsky in the central region
 Khangar in the central region
 Khodutka in the southern region
 Kikhpinych in the central region
 Kizimen in the central region
 Kliuchevskoi in the northern region
 Komarov in the central region
 Koryaksky in the central region
 Koshelev in the southern region
 Krasheninnikov in the central region
 Kronotsky in the central region
 Ksudach in the southern region 
 Maly Semyachik in the central region
 Mutnovsky in the southern region
 Opala in the southern region
 Sheveluch in the northern region
 Taunshits in the central region
 Tolbachik in the northern region
 Ushkovsky in the northern region
 Vysoky in the central region
 Zheltovsky in the southern region
 Zhupanovsky in the central region

Kuril Islands

 Antsiferov on Antsiferov Island
 Alaid on Atlasov Island
 Atsonupuri on Iturup Island 
 Baransky on Iturup Island
 Berutarube on Iturup Island
 Bogatyr Ridge on Iturup Island (includes Stokap)
 Bogdan Khmelnitsky on Iturup Island
 Brat Chirpoyev on Brat Chirpoyev Island
 Chikurachki on Paramushir Island (includes the Lomonosov and Tatarinov groups)
 Chirinkotan on Chirinkotan Island
 Chyorny on Chirpoy Island
 Ebeko on Paramushir Island
 Ekarma on Ekarma Island
 Fuss Peak on Paramushir Island
 Golovnin on Kunashir Island
 Goryashchy on Simushir Island
 Grozny Group on Iturup Island
 Karpinsky Group on Paramushir Island
 Kolokol Group on Urup Island (includes Berg and Trezubets)
 Kuntomintar on Shiashkotan Island
 Medvezhya Volcanic Group on Iturup Island (includes Kudryavy)
 Mendeleyeva on Kunashir Island
 Nemo Peak on Onekotan Island
 Pallas Peak on Ketoy Island
 Prevo Peak on Simushir Island
 Raikoke on Raikoke Island
 Rasshua on Rasshua Island
 Sarychev Peak on Matua Island
 Severgin on Kharimkotan Island
 Sinarka on Shiashkotan Island
 Snow on Chirpoy Island
 Tao-Rusyr Caldera on Onekotan Island (includes Krenitsyn Peak)
 Tyatya on Kunashir Island
 Yankicha in the Ushishir Islands
 Zavaritski Caldera on Simushir Island

See also
 Russian Academy of Sciences
 Alaska Volcano Observatory

References

External links
 

Earth sciences
Government agencies established in 1993
Volcano observatories
Volcanoes of Russia
Emergency services in Russia